The Lake Rukwa suckermouth (Chiloglanis rukwaensis) is a species of upside-down catfish native to Tanzania and Zambia where it is found in the Lake Rukwa drainage.  This species grows to a length of  TL.

References

External links 

Lake Rukwa suckermouth
Fish of Lake Rukwa
Lake Rukwa suckermouth
Lake Rukwa suckermouth
Taxonomy articles created by Polbot